Kalmar Verkstad AB (KVAB) was a Swedish train and automobile manufacturer in Kalmar, Sweden that made the Tjorven and Terminal. KVAB was founded in 1902 and closed in 2005 by Bombardier.

History and products
KVAB's core business was trains, and they built all kinds of locomotives, trams, passenger cars, freight cars for both Swedish market and export.

In the mid-sixties, KVAB also produced small trucks, boats, parking decks and cars for road use.
Tjorven was a small delivery van based on the DAF 44, Swedish Mail bought a lot of them for mail delivery.

Kalmar Terminal was a vehicle intended to be used for transporting goods in ports between ships and railway. One odd detail was that the door was located in the front. It had a V8 diesel engine, automatic gearbox, and semi-trailer coupling with built-in automatic air and electric connections. At forklift was mounted at the rear, so the truck driver could load and unload goods from the trailer.

Products
Y1 (railcar)
BM2 (train for Bucharest metro)
Regina
Öresundståg
X2
SL C20
BM 73b
BM 73a
Flytoget
Tjorven, aka Kalmar KVD440/441 or DAF Kalmar

Defunct motor vehicle manufacturers of Sweden